John Scarpati (born June 29, 1960) is a professional photographer whose photography has appeared on hundreds of album and CD covers for bands and individual musicians. He is also the owner of Scarpati Studio, a photography studio that does photography and layouts for advertising campaigns, some of which have won national and regional awards. Scarpati has produced two books based on his photography: Cramp, Slash, & Burn: When Punk and Glam Were Twins and Eyes Wide Open. The first major solo art exhibit of Scarpat's work was in 1991 at Midem – Palais des Festivals in Cannes, France. The exhibit was a dye transfer print series. Scarpati's work has also appeared in publications such as the New York Times and Rolling Stone Magazine.

Because of his extensive photography work with so many bands in Hollywood the 1980s, as well as the production of his book Cramp, Slash, & Burn: When Punk and Glam Were Twins, Alarm Magazine has referred to Scarpati as The Anthropologist of the Sunset Strip.

Career

Music Industry 

The majority of Scarpati's photography work has been done in the music industry, having worked on hundreds of album covers and photo shoots across different genres. He got his break at a recording studio in Sherman Oaks, CA where he met Journey lead-singer Steve Perry who was recording his first solo album. Scarpati didn't immediately recognize Perry and recalled later that he was "... driving home (from the recording studio) and ‘When The Lights Go Down’ (Lights by Journey) comes on and I thought, ‘Holy shit, that’s Steve Perry I was just talking to.'" Perry made good on a promise to stop by Scarpati's studio the following day for what originally was intended to be a shot for the inside sleeve of his new album. Ultimately, Scarpati's work became the iconic cover shot for Perry's Street Talk album. Scarpati has since worked with many famous musical artists, such as Rush, Def Leppard, Warrant and Kenny Rogers.

He has also done work for the following employers: Michael Jackson // Sherman Halsey // Planet Pictures // Delicious Vinyl // Dwight Yoakam // Hugh Syme // Fresh Design

Because of his extensive work with the band Fishbone, Scarpati's photos were featured in the documentary Everyday Sunshine. In addition, one of Scarpati's photos of the band was sent to the Smithsonian's National Museum of African American History and Culture, which also has a collection of artifacts from the band.

Advertising 
In his work through his company Scarpati Studio and other advertising firms, Scarpati has worked as a photographer or art director on a number of advertising campaigns for corporate clients. His artistic approach has won a number of awards, including one national ADDY award and two regional ADDY awards.

A partial list of Scarpati's Corporate clients include Bridgestone, Firestone, One Systems, Honda, AKG Microphones, Hunter Fans, Tequila Rose, Vantage Bowling, Fuzion, Paramount Studios, and English Eccentrics. In addition, his cover for the New York Dolls album One Day It Will Please Us To Remember Even This was used in an iPod Nano advertising campaign.

Books

Scarpati has produced two books based on his photography work.  This first, called Eyes Wide Open, is a collection of unusual and artistic images from his work. The Second is called Cramp, Slash, & Burn: When Punk and Glam Were Twins, and focuses on Scarpati's work in the Hollywood music scene in the 1980s.

Eyes Wide Open 
The photography artwork in Eyes Wide Open began as an art show exhibit in alternative venues, such as clubs, bars, and hotels. While there may appear to be no obvious cohesive theme to the book, the concept is a collection of fine art prints on a wide array of Substrates. The collection contains a number of artistic examples of the photographer's work and showcases his creativity.

Cramp, Slash, and Burn: When Punk and Glam Were Twins 
Cramp, Slash, & Burn: When Punk and Glam Were Twins is a collection of Scarpati’s photos from the Punk and Glam music industry in Hollywood during the 1980s. The photographs have been cleaned and digitized and the original film was wet drum scanned and digitally remastered to produce high quality images. The book is produced in a 12x12 format to mimic the size of traditional album covers. In addition, life size images of memorabilia from the period, including tick stubs, trinkets, and an authentic can of Aquanet from the time period. The text inside the book is written by band members and others who were a part of the scene at the time. The artwork from the book premiered at La Luz de Jesus Galley in Los Angeles and continues to be on display at various venues around the country.

The book won a Mohawk award and earned Scarpati the title "Anthropologist of the Sunset strip from Alarm Magazine, which said, “As a photographer, John Scarpati is well known for his work on album covers, each a dynamic and living piece of art. During the 1980s in Los Angeles, he was the music photographer, an anthropologist of the Sunset Strip, his lens documenting the fashion, sounds, and faces in the era of outrageous musical fashion." The Indie Reader, Culture Catch, and Felt and Wire also praised the accuracy of the book in documenting the era and scene.

Album cover art
Chronological list of John Scarpati's album cover art.

Awards and Notable Achievements

Gold and Platinum records 
Steve Perry – Street Talk
Poison – Look What the Cat Dragged In
L.A. Guns – L.A. Guns
Great White – Hooked
Warrant – Dirty Rotten Filthy Stinking Rich
Warrant – Cherry Pie
Rush – Roll The Bones
Kix – Blow My Fuse
Rush – Presto
Brooks & Dunn – Tight Rope
Buddy Jewell – Buddy Jewell

Achievements and recognition 
1984 – Scarpati's 1st album cover to go Platinum – Steve Perry / Street Talk: Columbia
1989 – Shot 1st music video – Tone Lōc / Wild Thing for Delicious Vinyl /camera operator DP
1990 – Juno Award – Best album cover – Rush / Presto – Atlantic
1991 – Worst album cover – Rolling Stone Magazine – Warrant Cherry Pie – Columbia
1992 – Juno Award – Best album cover – Rush / Roll the Bones – Atlantic
2005 – Honda Ad Campaign featured in Luerzer's Archive
2006 – iTunes podcast – interview with Scarpati by light source
2007 – Silver Addy "national" Design CD/DVD packaging – Mechanical Birds
2008 – Silver Addy – photography print Campaign "local" – De Novo Dahl – CD packaging
2008 – Apple iPod Nano "TV & Print" New York Dolls cover featured in advertising campaign
2009 – Shutterbug Magazine – feature article (March) Pro's Choice
2010 – Featured article PDN magazine – Scarpati Rocks the House – Legends of Photography Issue
2011 – 2 full page spread  – Sports Illustrated swimsuit edition – Bridgestone Tires Campaign

References

External links 
 Scarpati Studios Website
 Old Hollywood Light Company
 Scarpati on Etsy
 

American photographers
Living people
1960 births